The Nikkei, also known as , is the flagship publication of Nikkei, Inc. (based in Tokyo) and the world's largest financial newspaper, with a daily circulation exceeding 1.73 million copies.  The Nikkei 225, a stock market index for the Tokyo Stock Exchange, has been calculated by the newspaper since 1950.

It is one of the four national newspapers in Japan; the other three are The Asahi Shimbun, the Yomiuri Shimbun and the Mainichi Shimbun.

History
The roots of the Nikkei started with an in-house newspaper department of Mitsui & Company in 1876 when it started publication of Chugai Bukka Shimpo (literally Domestic and Foreign Commodity Price Newspaper), a weekly market-quotation bulletin. The department was spun out as the Shokyosha in 1882. The paper became daily (except Sunday) in 1885 and was renamed Chugai Shōgyō Shimpo in 1889. It was merged with Nikkan Kōgyō and Keizai Jiji and renamed Nihon Sangyō Keizai Shimbun in 1942. The paper changed its name to the Nihon Keizai Shimbun in 1946.

Criticism 
According to Shusuke Murai and Reiji Yoshida from The Japan Times, critics say the Nikkei is “depending too much on leaks — apparently provided by corporate insiders — and the paper is often seen as reluctant to bluntly criticize Japanese firms.” The New York Times reporter Hiroko Tabuchi said the Nikkei's purchase of the FT “Worrying", further stating that "[The] Nikkei is basically a PR machine for Japanese biz; it initially ignored the 2011 Olympus accounting scandal (which FT broke). Nikkei has also hardly covered the Takata airbag defect; almost no investigative work on that issue whatsoever. Nikkei is Japan Inc.”

Hong Kong 

On August 10, 2020, three Hong Kong Police Force officers visited the Hong Kong branch of The Nikkei with a court order. The reason being investigations over an advert placed in The Nikkei a year prior calling for international support for pro-democracy protests in Hong Kong.

See also 

 List of newspapers in Japan
 Media of Japan
 TXN

References

Further reading

External links

  
  

 
1876 establishments in Japan
Business in Japan
Business newspapers
Centre-right newspapers
Conservative liberalism
Conservative media in Japan
Daily newspapers published in Japan
Economic liberalism
Newspaper companies of Japan
Newspapers published in Tokyo
Publications established in 1876
Publications established in 1950